Charlotte Independent School District is a public school district based in Charlotte, Texas (USA).  Located in Atascosa County, a small portion of the district extends into Frio County.

In 2009, the school district was rated "academically acceptable" by the Texas Education Agency.

The most remarkable feature of the school authorities is that they have included all the websites which could help the students get Scholarships or other financial aids from other sources. This could be very helpful for the students as well as their parents.

History
According to Dr. Guadalupe San Miguel, in Charlotte ISD, is where the first official legal complaint regarding racial segregation against Mexicans and Mexican Americans in Texas took place in 1928.  The complaint was filed by Felipe Vela on behalf of his daughter, Amada Vela.  Their racial segregation complaint reached the Texas State Board of Education and they sided with the Vela family.

Schools
In the 2012-2013 school year, the district had students in five schools. 
High schools
Charlotte High School (Grades 9-12)
Middle schools
Charlotte Junior High (Grades 5-8)
Elementary schools
Charlotte Elementary (Grades EE-4)
Alternative schools
Atascosa County Alternative School (Grades 6-12)
District Reassignment and opportunity Center (Grades 6-12)

References

External links
 

School districts in Atascosa County, Texas
School districts in Frio County, Texas